Foxcatcher is a 2014 American biographical psychological sports film 
produced and directed by Bennett Miller. Written by E. Max Frye and Dan Futterman, the film stars Steve Carell, Channing Tatum, and Mark Ruffalo. The film's plot is loosely based on the events surrounding multimillionaire E.I. du Pont family heir and wrestling enthusiast John du Pont's 1986 recruitment of two 1984 U.S. Olympic gold medalist wrestlers, Mark Schultz and his older brother David, to help coach U.S. wrestlers for participation in national, world, and Olympic competition, and the subsequent murder of David Schultz by du Pont in January 1996.

Foxcatcher received critical acclaim for the three lead actors' performances, Miller's direction, and the film's visual style and tone. It was nominated for the Palme d'Or in the main competition section at the 2014 Cannes Film Festival, where Miller won the Best Director Award. The film had three Golden Globe Award nominations, including Best Motion Picture – Drama, Best Actor – Motion Picture Drama for Carell, and Best Supporting Actor – Motion Picture for Ruffalo. The film was nominated for five Oscars at the 2015 Academy Awards, including Best Actor for Carell, Best Supporting Actor for Ruffalo and Best Director for Miller. It became the first film to be nominated for Best Director but not Best Picture since 2008, when Julian Schnabel was nominated for The Diving Bell and the Butterfly, two years before the Academy extended its maximum number of Best Picture nominees to 10 films.

Plot
In 1987, Olympic wrestling champion Mark Schultz speaks at an elementary school in place of his older brother, Dave. Both are Olympic gold medal winners in 1984, but Mark feels overshadowed by Dave. Mark is contacted by philanthropist and wrestling enthusiast John E. du Pont, an heir to the E.I. du Pont family fortune, who arranges to fly Mark to his estate in Pennsylvania where du Pont has built a private wrestling training facility. Du Pont invites Mark to join his wrestling team, Team Foxcatcher, to be paid to train for the World Championship. Mark accepts the offer, with du Pont urging him to enlist Dave as well. Dave declines for the sake of his wife and two children, who are settled where they live, so Mark moves to Pennsylvania alone.

Mark stays in a homey guest house ("The Chalet") and is greeted there later in the night by du Pont. Through training with his new teammates and du Pont's financial support, Mark excels with Foxcatcher, winning a Gold Medal at the 1987 World Wrestling Championships. Du Pont praises him, and they develop a friendship. Du Pont introduces Mark to cocaine, which he starts to use regularly. He confides in Mark, whom he now calls a true friend, telling him how his mother, Jean du Pont, paid a boy to act as his friend. John organizes and funds an over-50 masters wrestling tournament, which he wins after his opponent is paid to lose the final match. However, Jean tells her son that she believes wrestling is a "low sport" and does not like seeing him "being low". One day, Mark and his teammates in Foxcatcher take the morning off from training to watch mixed martial arts (MMA) on TV. Angered by this (as well as Mark's bitter refusal to be in his brother's presence in Team Foxcatcher), John slaps Mark and berates him, saying that he will enlist Dave by any means necessary while also demanding that Mark work out his differences with his brother as soon as possible.

Dave decides to move with his family to Pennsylvania so he can join Foxcatcher. His self-esteem damaged by du Pont, Mark decides to work and train alone, pushing away both John and Dave. As Team Foxcatcher prepares to enter the preliminaries for the 1988 Summer Olympics in Seoul, John’s mother is escorted into his gym to watch him coach his team. He awkwardly demonstrates basic maneuvers for her and the other wrestlers. Jean leaves in disgust after seeing him give his back to his student.

At the 1988 Olympic Trials in Pensacola, Florida, Mark performs poorly, losing his first match. Angered by his failure, Mark destroys his room and goes on an eating binge, before Dave manages to break into his room and is alarmed at his brother's condition. They work feverishly so Mark can make his weight class. As Mark exercises, John arrives and attempts to speak with him, but Dave turns him away. Mark competes well enough to win his match and make the Olympic team. Dave notices that du Pont is absent, learning that he left for Pennsylvania after being told his mother died.

After returning to the estate, Mark tells Dave that "you and I both know that I can't stay" at Foxcatcher once the Olympics are over and asks Dave to leave with him. A documentary funded by John about his exploits with Team Foxcatcher is made, during which Dave is asked to praise him as coach and mentor; he reluctantly does so. Mark loses his matches in Seoul, after which he leaves Team Foxcatcher. While Dave continues to live at John’s estate and train with Foxcatcher, as a condition for his remaining, he negotiates an arrangement with du Pont to continue to support Mark financially.

Later, John is sitting alone in his mansion's trophy room watching the documentary about Team Foxcatcher, which ends with Mark complimenting him at a ceremony depicted earlier. John calls his bodyguard and drives to Dave's home, where he finds him in the driveway working on his car radio. As Dave approaches John's car to greet him, John pulls a gun on him and asks him if he has a problem with him before shooting him three times and driving away. Dave's wife, Nancy runs out to her husband, who dies in her arms. Setting a trap for John at his home, the police ambush and arrest him, and the film ends with Mark competing in a cage fighting match with the crowd's cheers ringing in his head.

Cast
 Steve Carell as John Eleuthère du Pont, American multimillionaire, philanthropist, and wrestling enthusiast
 Channing Tatum as Mark Schultz, an Olympic gold medal-winning wrestler
 Mark Ruffalo as Dave Schultz, an Olympic gold medal-winning wrestler, Mark's older brother
 Sienna Miller as Nancy Schultz, Dave's wife
 Vanessa Redgrave as Jean du Pont, John's mother
 Anthony Michael Hall as Jack
 David Zabriskie as Dan Bane
 Guy Boyd as Henry Beck
 Brett Rice as Fred Cole
 Bruce Baumgartner as USA wrestling rep #3
 Samara Lee as Danielle Schultz
 Jackson Frazer as Alexander Schultz
 Jane Mowder as Rosie
 Daniel Hilt as Robert Garcia
 Lee Perkins as Corporal Daly
 David "Doc" Bennett as Documentary Director
 Jazz Securo as MMA Announcer
 Brock Lesnar as Wrestler

Production
Bennett Miller began developing the project in 2010 after acquiring the rights to the story from Michael Coleman and Tom Heller. Megan Ellison financed the film through her Annapurna Pictures, also producing alongside Miller, Jon Kilik, and Anthony Bregman. Sony Pictures Classics became the distributor, taking over from Sony's Columbia Pictures, which had co-financed the film. Miller said "it's always been my hope and expectation that they (SPC) would distribute the film." Gary Oldman was first choice for the role of John E. du Pont, but he turned down the role due to his commitment to Dawn of the Planet of the Apes.

Shooting began in the Pittsburgh metropolitan area on October 15, 2012, in and near the suburbs of Sewickley, Pennsylvania, Sewickley Heights, and Edgeworth. With du Pont's mansion, Liseter Hall, having been demolished in January 2013, the filmmakers used Morven Park, a historic estate in Leesburg, Virginia with a similar facade, for exterior filming.  An 1899 mansion, Wilpen Hall, in the wealthy Pittsburgh suburb of Sewickley Heights, Pennsylvania, served as Foxcatcher's stand-in for the interior filming location for du Pont's Philadelphia-area estate.

Filming also took place in the Pittsburgh area communities of Rector (Ligonier Township), McKeesport, White Oak, and Connoquenessing. The production sought permission to film in West Mifflin Middle School in West Mifflin, Pennsylvania. In December 2012, filming took place in Washington High School, Trinity High School, the Petersen Events Center in the Pittsburgh neighborhood of Oakland, and the California University of Pennsylvania Convocation Center. Filming was scheduled to last through January 2013.

The scene where the Foxcatcher team watches mixed martial arts on television in 1988 uses footage from Gary Goodridge's win over Paul Herrera at UFC 8, from February 1996. At UFC 9 that March, Mark Schultz made his MMA debut, defeating Goodridge. In the film, he is depicted facing a fictional opponent. Channing Tatum stated that the role was "the hardest acting challenge I've had to date."

Release
A release date for Foxcatcher was originally set for December 20, 2013. The date was postponed to allow for more time to complete the film, according to Sony Pictures Classics. The film debuted at the 2014 Cannes Film Festival in May 2014, in competition for the Palme d'Or, the festival's highest prize, where director Bennett Miller won the Award for Best Director.

The film made its way through the late-2014 festival circuit, appearing at the Telluride, Toronto, New York, Vancouver and London film festivals. Foxcatcher received a limited release on November 14, 2014.

The film opened across U.S. theaters through December 2014 and January 2015. The film was released on Blu-ray and DVD March 3, 2015.

Reception

Box office
The film was given a limited release in North America on November 14, 2014, grossing $270,877 from 6 theaters, an average of $45,146 per theater. The film had its wide release on January 16, 2015, opening in 759 theaters and grossing $9,080 finishing 20th at the box office. Overall, Foxcatcher grossed $12.1 million in North America and $7.1 million in other territories for a total gross of $19.2 million, against its $24 million budget.

Critical response
Foxcatcher received critical acclaim, with many praising the performances of Carell, Tatum, and Ruffalo. On Rotten Tomatoes, the film holds an approval rating of 87% based on 253 reviews, with an average rating of 7.9/10. The site's critical consensus states, "A chilling true crime drama, Foxcatcher offers Steve Carell, Mark Ruffalo and Channing Tatum a chance to shine—and all three rise to the challenge." On Metacritic, the film has a score of 81 out of 100, based on 49 critics, indicating "universal acclaim".

Justin Chang of Variety praised the film, writing: "Steve Carell, Mark Ruffalo and Channing Tatum give superb performances in Bennett Miller's powerfully disturbing true-crime saga." Eric Kohn of Indiewire also reacted positively, with most of his praise going towards Carell's and Tatum's performances.

Donald Clarke of The Irish Times praised Miller's direction, saying that "he [Miller] hits his stride with a stunning portrayal of psychopathy and moral decadence in the unlikely environment of Olympic wrestling."  Todd McCarthy of The Hollywood Reporter praised Carell's performance, calling it "career changing."

Budd Wilkins of Slant Magazine, however, gave the film a negative review, writing that it "offers us next to nothing of utility or complexity about du Pont's pathology."

Reaction from Mark Schultz
Mark Schultz's reaction to the movie has been varied due to the intensely personal subject matter. He supported the film in general throughout its creation and served as a consultant. At one point he became angry and criticized Bennett Miller after critics pointed out "homosexual undertones" in the portrayal of the relationship between Mark Schultz and du Pont. Schultz then demanded Miller address the issue "or I will." Schultz said that "Foxcatchers scenes are mostly straight out of my book (except a few). But the relationships and personalities are complete fiction." Several weeks after these statements, Schultz recanted criticisms of the movie, saying "Foxcatcher is a miracle. I'm sorry I said I hated it. I love it," and apologized to Miller.

Top ten lists

 1st – Peter Rainer, The Christian Science Monitor
 1st – Katey Rich, The Village Voice
 2nd – Owen Gleiberman, BBC
 2nd – Stephen Holden, The New York Times
 2nd – Kristopher Tapley, HitFix
 2nd – Steve Persall, Tampa Bay Times
 3rd – Liam Lacey, The Globe and Mail
 3rd – Barbara Vancheri, Pittsburgh Post-Gazette
 3rd – Peter Travers, Rolling Stone
 4th – Jessica Kiang, Indiewire
 4th – Mara Reinstein, Us Weekly
 5th – Justin Chang and Scott Foundas, Variety
 5th – Ann Hornaday, The Washington Post
 5th – Betsy Sharkey, Los Angeles Times (tied with Whiplash)
 6th – Todd McCarthy, The Hollywood Reporter
 7th – Clayton Davis, Awards Circuit
 8th – Richard Roeper, Chicago Sun-Times
 8th – David Ansen, The Village Voice
 9th – Rex Reed, The New York Observer
 9th – Jocelyn Noveck, Associated Press
 Top 10 (listed alphabetically, not ranked) – Steven Rea, Philadelphia Inquirer
 Top 10 (listed alphabetically, not ranked) – Marshall Fine, Hollywood and Fine
 Top 10 (listed alphabetically, not ranked) – Joe Morgenstern, The Wall Street Journal
 Best of 2014 (listed alphabetically, not ranked) – Kenneth Turan, Los Angeles Times

Accolades

Real-life subsequent events
Following Dave Schultz's death, his widow, Nancy, and their two children moved to Northern California, where they still reside. In June 1997, Schultz was posthumously inducted into the U.S. National Wrestling Hall of Fame. Mark Schultz stopped wrestling competitively after the 1988 Summer Olympic games and now lives in Oregon where he coaches wrestling and works for Keppler Speakers.

In November 1999, John du Pont agreed in an out-of-court settlement of the civil suit filed against him by Nancy Schultz to pay Dave's three surviving heirs "at least $35 million," the largest amount resulting from a U.S. wrongful-death suit ever paid directly by one person.

A year after the shooting, du Pont, who had entered a plea of not guilty by reason of insanity, went on trial at the Delaware County Courthouse in Media, Pennsylvania. After three weeks of testimony followed by seven days of deliberation by the six-man, six-woman jury to consider eight distinct possible verdicts, on February 25, 1997 du Pont was found guilty but mentally ill of murder in the third degree. He was subsequently sentenced by Common Pleas Judge Patricia Jenkins to 13 to 30 years in prison.

According to then-Delaware County District Attorney (and future U.S. Representative) Pat Meehan, du Pont was the richest American ever tried for murder in the United States.

After a period of further psychiatric treatment at the Norristown State Hospital, du Pont was eventually transferred first to Cresson State Correctional Institution near Altoona, Pennsylvania and later to Laurel Highlands State Prison in Somerset, where he died on December 9, 2010 at age 72. Both facilities were formerly state-run mental hospitals. At the time of his death from chronic obstructive pulmonary disease, John du Pont had been incarcerated for murder for almost 15 years.

Foxcatcher Farm was eventually sold and the  estate broken up for development. A  segment is now occupied by the campus of The Episcopal Academy, a private independent K–12 school founded in 1785, which moved there in 2008 from split campuses located in the nearby Philadelphia Main Line communities of Merion and Devon.

The 90-year-old du Pont mansion, Liseter Hall, in which du Pont was raised and had lived for 57 years, was demolished in January 2013. The mansion stood on a  portion of the property that has now been developed by Toll Brothers into a "master planned community of 449 luxury homes" called "Liseter Estate."

Plot deviations from real life events

Notes

References

External links
 
 
 
 
 

2014 films
2014 biographical drama films
2010s sports drama films
American biographical drama films
American sports drama films
Sport wrestling films
Films about the 1988 Summer Olympics
Films about brothers
Sports films based on actual events
Drama films based on actual events
Biographical films about sportspeople
Films directed by Bennett Miller
Films scored by Rob Simonsen
Films scored by Mychael Danna
Films scored by West Dylan Thordson
Films set in 1987
Films set in 1988
Films set in Pennsylvania
Films set in France
Films set in Florida
Films set in Seoul
Films set in Washington, D.C.
Films shot in Pittsburgh
Annapurna Pictures films
Sony Pictures Classics films
Films produced by Megan Ellison
Crime films based on actual events
Cultural depictions of wrestlers
Cultural depictions of American men
2014 drama films
Films produced by Jon Kilik
2010s English-language films
2010s American films